Mathilde Weber (1829–1901), was a German feminist and social worker, regarded as one of the founders of the German women's movement. She focused on getting academic studies available for women.

Life
Weber née Walz was born on 16 August 1829 in Ellwangen, Germany. She was married to Heinrich Weber (1818-1890).

Weber was involved with the German women's movement and advocated for women to receive training to join the workforce. This included training as domestic servant. She established the Verein für Tübinger Honoratiorentöchter (Association for Tübingen Dignitary Daughters). In 1899 in Tübingen she was given the title Wohltäterin der Stadt (benefactress of the city).

She died on 22 June 1901 in Tübingen, Germany.

Notes

External links

Mathilde Weber – frauenbewegte Sozialreformerin im 19. Jahrhundert (Mathilde Weber - women-driven social reformer in the 19th century)

1829 births
1901 deaths
19th-century German people
German suffragists